Malli Malli is a 2009 Indian Telugu-language action-drama film directed by Raaj Adithya and starring Skanda Ashok and Kalyani in their Telugu debuts. The film is inspired by the Hollywood film If Only (2004). The film also marked the compositional debut for S. Thaman.

Plot 
All of the events in the story take place in a day. Nandu (Skanda) is an unemployed graduate who is suffering because he was unsuccessful in getting a job and is about to attempt suicide. A man convinces him that he will give Nandu money if he kills Satya (Sachin Khedekar). Nandu later wakes up and realizes that all of this was a dream. Although it was a dream, whatever he dreamt so far happened in real life. He uses what he learned from his dream to fall in love with his girlfriend, Madhu (Kalyanee), and save Satya from the killer.

Cast 

 Skanda as Nandu
 Kalyani as Madhumathi Satyanarayana
 Sachin Khedekar as Satya
 Venu Madhav
 Brahmanandam
 Krishna Bhagavaan
 Ravi Prakash
 Fish Venkat
 Melkote
  Apoorva
 Dr. Bharath
 Master Bharath

Production 
Raaj Aditya, who previously directed Pourudu (2008), directed this film. Rahul Ravindran, who starred in Moscowin Kavery was approached to play the lead role, but he was unable to sign the film as he was busy shooting other films. Aditya came across the songs from the Malayalam film, Notebook (2006) and signed Skanda Ashok for the lead role. Bollywood actor Sachin Khedekar was signed to portray a non-resident Indian. Kalyani, who starred with Mammooty in Parunthu (2008), was signed as the heroine. The film was shot in 42 days. The film will mark the Telugu debut of Kalyani after the release of her first film, Manchu Kurise Velalo, was delayed.

Soundtrack 
The film was composed by S. Thaman. Lyrics were written by Ananta Sriram and Ramajogayya Sastry. The music was launched by Daggubati Suresh Babu and the audio release function took place at Hotel Mariotte in Hyderabad on 7 December 2008. Amit Tiwari, Geeta Singh, Poonam Kaur, Krishnudu and director Saikiran were present at the audio launch.

Release 
Idlebrain gave the film two out of five stars and wrote that " Ironically, the director who wanted to discourage the depressed youth from attempting suicide finally succumbed to death by committing it on the release day of this film. On a whole, Malli Malli disappoints".

References

External links

Indian action drama films
2009 action drama films
2009 films
2000s Telugu-language films
Films about road accidents and incidents
Films scored by Thaman S